Karan-e Olya (also Romanized as Karān-e ‘Olyā, Karan Olya, and Kerān-e ‘Olyā; also known as Karān-e Bālā, Karrān-e Bālā, Kerān Bālā, Kerān-e Bālā, Kīrān-e Bālā, and Yukāri Karan) is a village in Baba Jik Rural District, in the Central District of Chaldoran County, West Azerbaijan Province, Iran. At the 2006 census, its population was 88, in 23 families.

References 

Populated places in Chaldoran County